is a former Japanese football player He is the current assistant managers of Vegalta Sendai.

Playing career
Yoshida was born in Saga Prefecture on October 5, 1980. After graduating from high school, he joined J1 League club Kyoto Purple Sanga in 1999. Although he played several matches as forward from 2000, he could not play many matches. In 2002, he moved to J2 League club Mito HollyHock. He played many matches in 2002. However his opportunity to play decreased from 2003. In 2005, he moved to Japan Football League club Tochigi SC. He played as regular player and scored many goals until 2006. However his opportunity to play decreased in 2007. In 2008, he moved to Regional Leagues club Matsumoto Yamaga FC. He retired end of 2008 season.

Club statistics

References

External links

kyotosangadc

1980 births
Living people
Association football people from Saga Prefecture
Japanese footballers
J1 League players
J2 League players
Japan Football League players
Kyoto Sanga FC players
Mito HollyHock players
Tochigi SC players
Matsumoto Yamaga FC players
Association football forwards